The Sharjah Cup was an international limited-overs cricket tournament that took place at the Sharjah Cricket Association Stadium in Sharjah, UAE on multiple occasions between 1984 and 2003.

The stadium usually hosted two tournaments each season: a "Champions Trophy" in October/November, and a "Cup" in March/April.  Typically three teams would participate in the tournament, but the format would vary, with as few as two and as many as six teams appearing.  The team which competed most often in the Sharjah Cup was Pakistan, who appeared in 28 of the 32 tournaments; Pakistan are also its most successful team, with a total of 15 titles.

Tournament results by season

References

Cricket in the United Arab Emirates
Recurring events disestablished in 2003
2003 disestablishments in the United Arab Emirates